Ẹdẹ is a town in Osun State, southwestern Nigeria. The two (2) local government areas in Ẹdẹ are Ẹdẹ South and Ẹdẹ North. 
There are three (3) major tertiary institutions in Ẹdẹ, which makes the town one of the fastest growing towns in the south-west with an increasing literacy rate. The Federal Polytechnic Ẹdẹ, Adeleke University, and Redeemer's University are among the institutions.

Ẹdẹ is a predominantly Muslim town with about 60% of the population. This can be traced back to 19th century during the reign of Timi Abibu Lagunju as the king of Ẹdẹ, who is most likely the first Muslim Oba in Yorubaland given the fact that he was already on the throne for a few years when in November 1857, the Baptist missionary W. H. Clark visited Ẹdẹ. Clarke record thus: "This young follower of the Prophet (Prophet Muhammad), a short time since became the ruler of this town in the place of his father (Oduniyi), the deceased, and brings with him into office, the influence of his new religion (Islam)."

See also
Federal Polytechnic, Ede

References

Populated places in Osun State
Towns in Yorubaland